Cai Yeqing (born May 23, 1971) is a Chinese sport shooter. She competed at the 2000 Summer Olympics in the women's 25 metre pistol event, in which she placed eighth.

References

1971 births
Living people
ISSF pistol shooters
Chinese female sport shooters
Shooters at the 2000 Summer Olympics
Olympic shooters of China
Asian Games medalists in shooting
Asian Games gold medalists for China
Asian Games silver medalists for China
Shooters at the 1998 Asian Games
Medalists at the 1998 Asian Games
21st-century Chinese women